The Battle of Falun was the first battle of the Swedish War of Liberation that took place in Falun, Sweden on February 5, 1521. Swedish rebels under Gustav Vasa, who had just days earlier been proclaimed leader of the Dalecarlians against the Danes, raided Falun. The rebels, consisting of a few hundred poorly armed peasants and some noble officers, took the Danish forces in the town completely by surprise. The local fogde Kristoffer Olsson and a few others labelled as "traitors" were captured. Local shops run by German merchants were plundered, and the population taxed.

The rebels continued onwards through the region, gaining many new recruits. Shortly after they returned to Falun, and the locals pledged allegiance to Gustav Vasa and his cause. The rebellion continued until the Treaty of Malmö in 1524. A year earlier, in 1523, Vasa was crowned King of Sweden.

References
 

1521 in Europe
Falun
Falun
Stockholm
16th century in Denmark
1521 in Sweden
1521 in Denmark
Falun